is a 1992–2008 manga series by Yoko Kamio.

Boys Over Flowers or Hana yori Dango may also refer to:

 Hana yori Dango (1995 film), a Japanese live-action film adaptation

 Boys Over Flowers (2005 TV series), the first season of a Japanese live-action television adaptation
 Boys Over Flowers 2, the second season of the Japanese live-action television adaptation
 Hana yori Dango Final: The Movie, a Japanese live-action film which concludes the Japanese live-action television adaptation

 Boys Over Flowers (2009 TV series), a 2009 South Korean television adaptation

 F4 Thailand: Boys Over Flowers, a 2021 Thai television adaptation

See also 
 Meteor Garden (disambiguation)